"Prayers / Triangles" is a song by American alternative metal band Deftones, appearing on their eighth studio album Gore. The song was released as the lead single from the album on February 4, 2016.

The song was remixed by synthwave musician Com Truise and released as a single on June 24, 2016.

Music video
An audio video for the song was released on February 4, 2016 and was directed by Chris Buongiorno and consists of animations of the flamingos from the Gore album cover flying.

The official music video for the song was released two months later on April 12 and was directed by Charles Bergquist. The video consists of the band performing with shots of Chino Moreno running down a street. While the video is mostly in black and white, some colors make appearances, such as orange, pink, yellow, and green. Images of triangles also appear throughout the video.

Track listing
Promo single

Remix single

Charts

Personnel
Chino Moreno – vocals
Stephen Carpenter – guitar
Sergio Vega – bass
Frank Delgado – keyboards, samples
Abe Cunningham – drums

References

2016 songs
2016 singles
Deftones songs
Songs written by Chino Moreno
Warner Records singles
Reprise Records singles